Joseph (pronounced ) also known as Joseph le Nègre (c. 1793 – unknown) was a 19th-century Haitian acrobat, actor, and art model. Active primarily in Paris, Joseph is best known for his professional relationship with the French Romantic painter Théodore Géricault and for serving as a principal model for Géricault's The Raft of the Medusa (1819). 

Having left Haiti in the aftermath of the Haitian Revolution, Joseph arrived in Marseille around 1804 and moved to Paris in 1808. He made a living as an acrobat and actor before being hired by Géricault sometime in 1818. After the success of The Raft of the Medusa at the 1819 Paris Salon, Joseph began to model for other contemporary French artists, including Théodore Chassériau, Horace Vernet, and Adolphe Brune.

In 1832, Joseph became one of only three male models employed at l’École des Beaux-Arts de Paris. Although he has been described as "one of the most famous Black models of the era," Joseph had never achieved broader recognition beyond the artistic circles of Paris. Similarly to other people of color living in 19th-century France, his professional life was conditioned by the political and social consequences of French colonialism and marred by racial discrimination.

Early life and work

Haiti and France (1793 to 1818) 
Joseph's family name has not been recorded, although it is believed that he was born in the French colony of Saint Domingue, present day Haiti, around 1793. He is said to have arrived in France in or around 1804 and first settled in Marseille. By 1808, Joseph had moved to Paris where he was hired as an acrobat and actor for Madame Saqui's troupe. Joseph was one of the many immigrants who had left Haiti in the aftermath of the 1791 Haitian Revolution and the subsequent abolition of slavery in the French colonies (which lasted from 1794 until 1804, before being legalized again by Napoleon). He is believed to have lived in the northern part of Paris, likely the 9th or 17th arrondissement, neighborhoods popular with contemporary artists, art models, and communities of color, including Alexandre Dumas and Laure.Joseph gained recognition after serving as a principal model for Géricault's The Raft of the Medusa, an 1819 painting depicting a moment from the aftermath of the wreck of the French naval frigate Méduse, which ran aground off the coast of today's Mauritania on 2 July 1816. Joseph, whom Géricault had first encountered during an acrobatic show, was hired as a model shortly after the artist began working on The Raft of the Medusa in 1818. According to some accounts, only one of the fifteen survivors on the raft, a soldier named Jean Charles, is said to have been Black, although there are at least two Black men in Géricault's painting. Both of them were modeled after Joseph.

The Raft of the Medusa (1818 to 1819) 
Most notably, Joseph served as a model for the man assumed to be Jean Charles, waving a dark red handkerchief in hopes of being noticed by the passing ship. Influenced by an ancient Greek Classical sculpture titled Belvedere Torso and with his back turned toward the viewer, Joseph's silhouette is placed atop the pyramidal grouping of survivors in the composition's right half. The artist closely studied Joseph's physique before incorporating his torso into the final composition which is evident in the model's back study completed between 1818 and 1819.The artist also incorporated a small rendering of Joseph's face in the composition. With his gaze directed toward the spectator, he can be seen within a group of three figures positioned between the wooden mast and the supporting rope on the mast's right-hand side. Around the same time he painted The Raft of the Medusa, the artist also completed a portrait study of Joseph, dressed in military uniform, in a manner consistent with tête d’étude, an established tradition in the French studio practice wherein a portrait of an individual is painted for possible use in large-scale compositions.

Joseph has been described as Géricault's favorite model and the artist is said to have admired him as an individual, a sentiment art historians suggest is reflected in the deeply personal approach to the 1818-1819 portrait. When discussing the study, the British artist and writer Peter Brathwaite emphasizes Géricault's attention to detail in portraying a person of color and suggests that the viewer is invited into the "world of an actual, distinct person." Moreover, it has been suggested that Joseph served as inspiration for a third individual included in The Raft of the Medusa, a man seen seated in the middle of composition directly in front of the mast.

Joseph and abolitionism 
Géricault identified as an abolitionist and his decision to include representations of Black people in The Raft of the Medusa has been interpreted as a political statement against slavery and French colonialism. Art historian Albert Alhadef, pointing to "strong antipathy" towards people of color among the general French public during the early 19th-century, called the artist's inclusion of Black individuals in the painting an "extraordinary burst of fearless independence." Surviving accounts indicate that the decision was controversial. Italian art model known as Cadamour, who also posed for The Raft of the Medusa, was allegedly "scandalized" that Géricault had decided to hire a Black model.

Art historians Klaus Berger and Diane Chalmers Johnson note that Géricault made the individual modeled on Joseph the "focal point of the drama, the strongest and most perceptive of the survivors, in a sense, the 'hero of the scene.'" They argue that the artist's choice to do so was not a "last-minute" decision as evidenced by early sketches for the work, including the portrait study, and point to Géricault's concerns regarding the "extreme cruelties" of illegal slave trade in the French colonies. Echoing this sentiment, the Congolese writer and artist Bona Mangangu describes Joseph's Black body as "powerful, in good health, which rises above the white bodies, survivors of the raft weakened by disease and fatigue." According to Come Fabre, a curator at the Louvre in Paris where Géricault's painting is on permanent display, the artist "wanted to show the equality of man when facing terror and death."

Later career

Paris Academy (1830s) 

In 1832, Joseph was hired at the l’École des Beaux-Arts de Paris becoming one of its only three male models. He held the position until at least 1835. When discussing Joseph's career, scholar Emmelyn Butterfield-Rosen notes that in 19th-century France "body of a life model functioned as a floating signifier, assuming different meanings when inserted into different compositional contexts" and in the case of Joseph, it was almost always conditioned by the cultural connotations Europeans "attached to his skin pigment." 

In an 1836 study ordered by Jean-Auguste-Dominique Ingres, the painter Théodore Chassériau shows Joseph floating against the sky and next to two small hand studies. At the time of its completion, Butterfield-Rosen says, neither the model nor the artist (who was a grandson of a Haitian landowner of mixed-race) was made aware that Ingres had planned to use Joseph in a religious composition and depict him as "the devil cast down from the mountaintop." In a painting by Abel de Pujol completed in 1848 and drawing upon a Biblical subject matter, Joseph is depicted as a eunuch of the Queen of Ethiopia being baptized by Saint Philip.

Late years (1840s to 1860s) 
Joseph would go on to pose for other prominent French artists, including Horace Vernet, Alfred de Dreux, and Adolphe Brune. Surviving records indicate that he was primarily admired for his physique, which contemporary artists perceived as impressive and visually attractive. An article from the French newspaper Le Figaro published in 1858 described Joseph as "the most handsome model who ran the ateliers of Paris" and claimed that there was not a single French “artist, painter or sculptor who does not know Joseph." 

Bona Mangangu suggests that surviving contemporary accounts of Joseph–including an 1840 passage by the French writer Émile de La Bédollière where Joseph, longing for his "his native land," is described as constantly distracted–point to the continued perception of Black person as that of an inferior race. Despite his success in the art circles of Paris, Mangangu notes, Joseph was not broadly recognized and, similarly to other people of color, would continue to face systemic racism in France even after slavery had finally been abolished in 1848. He further explains that art modeling was considered a "vile profession" which usually paid an average of three Francs per each session, a relatively small amount. 

Among the late surviving depictions of Joseph is a painting by Brune exhibited at the 1865 academic salon in Paris. In this composition, Joseph is seen with his torso exposed, seated against a natural backdrop and holding a porcelain cup while smiling. According to scholar Jean Nayrolles, Brune's late composition continues to perpetuate racial stereotypes through the subject's "anthropological gaze," associating the Black body with "benevolent" nature and sexuality. 

Toward the end of his life and career, Joseph worked at the studio of the Swiss artist Charles Gleyre with whom he had become friends while living in Paris. His exact death date is unknown, although it is estimated he died sometime in the late 1860s or early 1870s.

Legacy 
In 2019, an exhibition titled Posing Modernity: The Black Model from Manet and Matisse to Today at the Musée d'Orsay in Paris, which focused on representation of the Black body in French modern art, included paintings of Joseph by Brune and Chassériau, among others. The show was an expanded version of a 2018 exhibition of the same name organized by Denise Murrell at the Wallach Art Gallery at Columbia University in New York. In 2021, French writer Arnaud Beunaiche published Je suis Joseph, a fictionalized biographical account of the model. It premiered as a theatrical play at L'Imaginaire in Douchy-les-Mines in February 2022. In 2023, the Getty Museum in Los Angeles organized a digital exhibition via Google Arts & Culture platform titled Study of the Model Joseph, Nineteenth-Century Paris, and Romanticism and dedicated entirely to Joseph.

Notes

See also 

 Fanny Eaton
 Laure (art model)

Citations 

19th-century French people
Acrobats
French artists' models
Haitian emigrants to France
French art
19th-century paintings
1800s in art
Academic art
Romantic art